is the eighth single by Japanese entertainer Akina Nakamori. Written by Etsuko Kisugi and Kōji Tamaki, the single was released on April 11, 1984, by Warner Pioneer through the Reprise label. It was also the lead single from her sixth studio album Possibility.

The single became Nakamori's fourth No. 1 on Oricon's weekly singles chart and sold over 543,900 copies.

Track listing

Charts

References

External links 
 
 
 

1984 singles
1984 songs
Akina Nakamori songs
Japanese-language songs
Warner Music Japan singles
Reprise Records singles
Oricon Weekly number-one singles